The Church of Saint Philip Howard  is a parish of the Roman Catholic Church in Kingston, Norfolk Island, within the Archdiocese of Sydney. The parish church is located on Queen Elizabeth Avenue and John Adams Road.

The Catholic history of the island goes back to the 1800–1, when the Irish convict priests Fr James Harold and Fr Peter O'Neil were sent there from Sydney; Fr O'Neil conducted a school. Benedictine priest Fr. William Ullathorne visited the island on two separate occasions, and published the pamphlet "The Catholic Mission in Australasia" in 1838 exposing the poor conditions and unjust treatment of transported convicts there. The parish was established in 1959, and for many years had a resident Marist priest who took care of the community's pastoral needs. Since the last Marist left in 1987, the Archdiocese has sent guest clerics to the island for stints of one or two weeks and celebrate Mass, perform baptisms, and handle similar duties.

The church was rededicated to St Philip Howard on a visit of James Cardinal Freeman. Howard was an English nobleman canonised by Pope Paul VI in 1970 as one of the Forty Martyrs of England and Wales.

See also
Catholic Church in Australia

References

Roman Catholic churches in Norfolk Island
Roman Catholic churches completed in 1959
1959 establishments in Australia
Christian organizations established in 1959
20th-century Roman Catholic church buildings in Australia